Juru is a new village and suburb of Kg. Sg. Pau in Simpang Ampat, Penang, Malaysia. It is located southwest of Bukit Mertajam and southwest of Perai. Juru is served by the North–South Expressway Northern Route and connects the town to Butterworth and Bayan Lepas, the latter being located on Penang Island.

Shopping
Auto City Juru
Icon City BM

References

Villages in Penang